Abu Muḥammad Chishti was famous Sufi of Chishti Order.

Career
Chishti was disciple of Abu Aḥmad Abdal Chishti and master of  Abu Yusuf ibn Saman
He died in 1020. Abu Muḥammad Chishti was part of golden chain of Chishti Order of Sufism.

See also
Chishti Order

References

Chishti Order
Sufi saints
Chishtis